Antonios Papadopoulos (born 10 September 1999) is a German professional footballer who plays as a defensive midfielder for Borussia Dortmund.

Career
Papadopoulos began his career with VfR Aalen in 2017, and transferred to Hallescher FC in 2019. In 2021, he transferred to the Borussia Dortmund reserves. He appeared for the senior Borussia Dortmund team in a 3–0 DFB-Pokal win over SV Wehen Wiesbaden on 7 August 2021.

Personal life
Born in Germany, Papadopoulos is of Greek descent.

References

External links
 
 

1999 births
Living people
German footballers
German people of Greek descent
Association football midfielders
VfR Aalen players
Hallescher FC players
Borussia Dortmund II players
Borussia Dortmund players
Bundesliga players
3. Liga players